Pittsburg State University (Pitt State or PSU) is a public university in Pittsburg, Kansas. It enrolls approximately 7,400 students (6,000 undergraduates and 1,400 graduate students) and is a member of the Kansas Board of Regents.

History

Pittsburg State University was founded in 1903 as the Auxiliary Manual Training Normal School, originally a branch of the State Normal School of Emporia (now Emporia State University). In 1913, it became a full-fledged four-year institution as Kansas State Teachers College of Pittsburg, or Pittsburg State for short. Over the next four decades, its mission was broadened beyond teacher training. To reflect this, in 1959 its name was changed again to Kansas State College of Pittsburg. It became Pittsburg State University on April 21, 1977.

Presidents
Pittsburg State has had 11 leaders. The top leadership post was originally titled "principal" from 1903 to 1913. In 1913, the title was changed to president.
 Russell S. Russ (1903–1911)
 George E. Myers (1911–1913)
 William A. Brandenburg (1913–1940)
 O. P. Dellinger (1940–1941)
 Rees H. Hughes (1941–1957)
 Leonard H. Axe (1957–1965)
 George F. Budd (1965–1977)
 James Appleberry (1977–1983)
 Donald W. Wilson (1983–1995)
 John R. Darling (1995–1999)
 Tom W. Bryant (1999–2009)
 Steven A. Scott (2009–2022)
 Dan Shipp (2022–present)

Campus
Located in southeast Kansas, the  campus is also the home of the $30 million Kansas Technology Center, a state-of-the-art technology program in the largest academic building in Kansas.

In December 2014, the university opened the Bicknell Family Center for the Arts. The Bicknell Center provides Pittsburg State University with its first true performance facility since 1978, when deterioration forced the closure of Carney Hall. In addition to the Linda & Lee Scott Performance Hall, the facility also houses a 250-seat theater, a 2,000-square-foot art gallery, grand lobby, reception hall, and multi-use rehearsal space for large musical groups.

PSU also operates a satellite campus in the Kansas City metro area, the Kansas City Metro Center Campus, offering a variety of bachelor's and master's degrees. Two degrees are offered in Salina, Kansas on the campus of Salina Area Technical College.

Student life

Greek organizations
Recognized fraternities and sororities at this university include:

Academics
PSU is organized into the following schools and colleges:
 College of Arts and Science
 Kelce College of Business
 College of Education
 College of Technology

The Kelce College of Business is accredited by the American Assembly of Collegiate Schools of Business (AACSB). In addition, research institutes are located on campus such as the Business & Technology Institute and the Kansas Polymer Research Center, housed in the newly completed Tyler Research Center.

Athletics

The Pittsburg State athletic teams are called the Gorillas. The university is a member of the NCAA Division II ranks, primarily competing in the Mid-America Intercollegiate Athletics Association (MIAA) since the 1989–90 academic year. The Gorillas previously competed in the Central States Intercollegiate Conference (CSIC) of the National Association of Intercollegiate Athletics (NAIA) from 1976–77 to 1988–89; in the Great Plains Athletic Conference (GPAC) from 1972–73 to 1975–76; in the Rocky Mountain Athletic Conference (RMAC) from 1968–69 to 1971–72; in the Central Intercollegiate Athletic Conference (CIC) from 1923–24 to 1967–68; and in the Kansas Collegiate Athletic Conference (KCAC) from 1902–03 to 1922–23.

Pittsburg State competes in 12 intercollegiate varsity sports: Men's sports include baseball, basketball, cross country, football and track & field (indoor and outdoor); while women's sports include basketball, cross country, softball, track & field (indoor and outdoor) and volleyball. Club sports include men's baseball.

Football

The Pitt State football program began in 1908 under head coach Albert McLeland. Since that time, the program has produced the most wins in NCAA Division II history. It has been national champions on four occasions; 1957,1961,1991 and 2011. Pittsburg State defeated Wayne State University, MI, 35–21 to claim its most recent national championship in 2011. During the 2004 season the Gorillas finished 14–1, losing 31–36 to Valdosta State University in the NCAA Division II National Football Championship. Pittsburg State has won, outright or shared, a total of 27 conference championships during the 96-year history of its intercollegiate program, including 13 conference titles in the last 19 seasons under Coach Chuck Broyles PSU reached the Division II National Championship game in 2004, 1995, and 1992. Its games with fellow MIAA Division II powerhouse Northwest Missouri State University are played at Arrowhead Stadium in Kansas City, Missouri, in the Fall Classic at Arrowhead. 26,695 attended the 2002 game—the most of any Division II game.

The Gorillas
PSU is the only university in the United States to feature a gorilla as a mascot. The concept of the mascot was conceived in 1920, and officially adopted on January 15, 1925. Current mascot, Gus, was designed in 1985 by L. Michael Hailey.

Apple Day
Back in 1907, a small delegation from the Pittsburg area lobbied the state legislature to give the newly established university an appropriation that would pay for the construction of the school's first building. But one of the delegate members, Pittsburg mayor Clarence Price, apparently broke the rules by not exiting the floor before the session began (in some versions of the story, it was the namesake of Russ Hall, R. S. Russ, who performed the gaffe). The legislators good-naturedly fined the Pittsburg delegation a barrel of apples before awarding them the appropriation. And when the men returned to Pittsburg, the students were so amused by the story that they decided university administrators and faculty who had missed work and class in order to lobby in Topeka should have to pay the same fine. In those days, students were penalized for truancy. Because members of the faculty left their classrooms in order to attend the legislative session in Topeka, the students reasoned that faculty members should be penalized for their absence.

Twelve months later, on March 6, 1908, classes were dismissed for the entire day in honor of the first Apple Day (officially titled Commemoration Day). During an afternoon program in the assembly room of the Central School building, the students once again fined the faculty a barrel of apples. Thus began the unique, annual, tradition at Pittsburg State of the teachers bringing apples for their students.

Notable people

 Fira Basuki, Indonesian novelist
 John Brown, wide receiver for the Buffalo Bills
 Gary Busey, film actor (attended, did not graduate)
 Terry Calloway, former Republican member of the Kansas House of Representatives
 Willie Fritz, current head football coach at Tulane University
 Eldon Danenhauer, Offensive tackle for the Denver Broncos
 Ralph Earhart, former NFL halfback, Green Bay Packers
 Dennis Franchione, former head football coach of Texas A&M University (and former coach of Pittsburg State)
 Eugene Maxwell Frank, Bishop of the United Methodist Church
 Kendall Gammon, former NFL longsnapper, Kansas City Chiefs and current Chiefs radio analyst (currently employed by Pittsburg State)
 Don Gutteridge, Major League Baseball player and manager (Chicago White Sox)
 Jay W. Hood, Major General U.S. Army, Commander 1st U.S. Army East, Ft. Meade, Maryland, former commanding general JTF Guantánamo Bay, Cuba
 David P. Hurford, psychologist and researcher in dyslexia and attention deficit hyperactivity disorder 
 John E. Jacobs, Interim president of Emporia State in 1953; Director of Special Education for the Kansas State Department of Education from 1953–1957
 Jennifer Knapp, Grammy-nominated Christian music artist; sold over 1 million albums
 Inez Y. Kaiser, the first African-American woman to run a public relations company with national clients 
Jake LaTurner, member of the U.S. House of Representatives from Kansas's 2nd district 
 Sherm Lollar, Major League Baseball player
 Aaron McConnell, American football player
 Ronald Moore, former NFL running back (Arizona Cardinals), 1992 Harlon Hill Trophy winner
 Brian Moorman, NFL punter, Buffalo Bills
 Sam Pittman, head football coach of the Arkansas Razorbacks
 Jim Press, Chrysler, vice chairman and president
 H. Lee Scott, former Wal-Mart president and CEO
 Steven A. Scott, ninth president of Pittsburg State University
 Michael Shonrock, former president of Emporia State University
 Joe Skubitz, U. S. representative
 Sally Stonecipher, first female United States Army helicopter pilot
 James Tate, writer who won the 1992 Pulitzer Prize for poetry
 Duane Thiessen, lieutenant general, United States Marine Corps
 Lucinda Todd, civil rights activist and plaintiff, Brown vs. Board of Education of Topeka
 Jackie Vietti, President of Butler Community College for 17 years; served as interim president of Emporia State University in 2015
 Steve Weddle, American novelist
 Pat Woodrum, Executive director of Oklahoma Centennial Botanical Garden; former executive director of the Tulsa City-County Library System
 Darryl Wren, former NFL defensive back
 Douglas Youvan, biophysicist
 David Kan, South African businessman

References

External links 

 
 Pitt State athletics website

 
Educational institutions established in 1903
Public universities and colleges in Kansas
Universities and colleges in Pittsburg, Kansas
1903 establishments in Kansas